Category 3 cable, commonly known as  or station wire, and less commonly known as VG or voice-grade (as, for example, in 100BaseVG), is an unshielded twisted pair (UTP) cable used in telephone wiring. It is part of a family of standards defined jointly by the Electronic Industries Alliance (EIA) and the Telecommunications Industry Association (TIA) and published in TIA/EIA-568-B.

Networking
 was widely used in computer networking in the early 1990s for 10BASE-T Ethernet and, to a much lesser extent, for 100BaseVG Ethernet, Token Ring and 100BASE-T4. The original Power over Ethernet 802.3af specification supports the use of  cable, but the later 802.3at Type 2 high-power variation does not. In some use cases and for short distances, Cat 3 may be capable of carrying 100BASE-TX (2 pairs) or even 1000BASE-T (4 pairs). Such use cases include hobbyist retrofitting short home telephone Cat 3 networks for Ethernet.

Dedicated 100BASE-T4 networks, supporting 100 Mbit/s over Cat 3, appear to have been a rarity as very few network interface controllers and switches were ever released. Some examples include the 3com 3C250-T4 Superstack II HUB 100, IBM 8225 Fast Ethernet Stackable Hub and Intel LinkBuilder FMS 100 T4. The same applies to network interface controller cards. Bridging 100BASE-T4 with 100BASE-TX required additional network equipment.

Replacement

See also
 Copper cable certification

References

External links
 How Low Voltage Cable is Made - Cat5e, Cat6, Cat3 and OSP

Ethernet cables